Bass Lake is a lake in Patterson Township, part of the Almaguin Highlands, Parry Sound District, Ontario, Canada.

See also
List of lakes in Ontario

References
 National Resources Canada

Lakes of Parry Sound District